The 9th (Wellington East Coast) Mounted Rifles was formed on March 17, 1911. They were mobilised during World War I as a squadron of the Wellington Mounted Rifles Regiment. They served in the Middle Eastern theatre of World War I and first saw action during the Battle of Gallipoli.
As a part of the larger New Zealand Mounted Rifles Brigade (of the ANZAC Mounted Division) they went on to serve in the Sinai and Palestine Campaign.

Great War Battles 
Battle of Gallipoli
Battle of Romani
Battle of Magdhaba
Battle of Rafa
First Battle of Gaza
Second Battle of Gaza
Third Battle of Gaza
Battle of Beersheba
Battle of Megiddo (1918)

Between the Wars
In 1921 they became the 7th New Zealand Mounted Rifles (Wellington East Coast) and later still became the Wellington East Coast Mounted Rifles, which was later was absorbed into the 2nd Armoured Regiment, on the 29 March 1944.

Alliances
 – 7th Queen's Own Hussars

References

Military units and formations established in 1911
Military units and formations disestablished in 1921
New Zealand in World War I
Cavalry regiments of New Zealand
Military units and formations of New Zealand in World War I
History of the Wellington Region
1911 establishments in New Zealand